The campaign of the province of Daraa, which began on 14 November 2011 is a part of the Syrian Civil War, consisting of several battles and offensives in the province of southern Syria.

Offensives 
Daraa Governorate clashes (2011–13): Series of military clashes that started since the Civil Uprising phase of the Syrian Civil War in 2011, until late 2013. The FSA captures several districts.
2013 Daraa offensive: Launched by the Opposition to seize border areas in the governorate.
Daraa offensive (October 2014): Rebels seize more Syrian Army-held territories.
First Battle of Al-Shaykh Maskin: Rebels capture part of Al-Shaykh Maskin from the Syrian Arab Army.
Daraa offensive (January 2015): Rebels finally capture all of Al-Shaykh Maskin.
2015 Southern Syria offensive: Syrian army retakes Deir al-Adas and surrounding areas.
Battle of Bosra (2015): Rebels capture Bosra.
Battle of Nasib Border Crossing: Rebels capture the Nasib Border Crossing and take control of the Syrian-Jordan border.
Daraa and As-Suwayda offensive (June 2015): Rebel take Brigade 52, al-Rakham, al-Meleha al-Gharbia, al-Koum checkpoint, and Sakakah.
Daraa offensive (June–July 2015): Syrian army withstand rebel attack across Daraa city.
Second Battle of Al-Shaykh Maskin: The Syrian Government forces recapture Al-Shaykh Maskin from rebels control.
Daraa offensive (March–April 2016): Rebels capture ISIL-controlled territory.
Daraa offensive (February–June 2017): A joint Tahrir al-Sham, Jaish al-Islam, Ahrar al-Sham and Southern Front attack captures most of the al-Manishiyah District of Daraa city.
Southwestern Daraa offensive (February 2017): ISIL captures rebel-controlled territory.
Daraa offensive (June 2017): Syrian army captures at least 50% of the Daraa Refugee Camp.
2018 Southern Syria offensive: Syrian army captures majority of the Daraa Province.
Daraa insurgency (2020 Daraa clashes, 2021 Daraa clashes): An ongoing insurgency waged by rebel remnants in Daraa. Large-scale clashes occur in 2020 and 2021

Maps 2012–2018

References

Battles of the Syrian civil war
Daraa Governorate in the Syrian civil war
Military operations of the Syrian civil war in 2011
Military operations of the Syrian civil war in 2012
Military operations of the Syrian civil war in 2013
Military operations of the Syrian civil war in 2014
Military operations of the Syrian civil war in 2015
Military operations of the Syrian civil war in 2016
Military operations of the Syrian civil war in 2017